For the Mexican singer, see Christian Chávez.

Cristian Manuel Chávez (born June 16, 1986 in Pilar, Buenos Aires) is an Argentine football midfielder currently playing for Wilstermann.

Chávez made his competitive debut on 3 July 2005 in a fiery game against Almagro, which was suspended due to violence and recorded as a defeat for both teams. On 27 January 2016, he signed a year and a half contract to Greek club Asteras Tripoli playing for Super League for an undisclosed fee.

Achievements

Club 
Boca Juniors
Primera División: 2008 Apertura, 2011 Apertura
Recopa Sudamericana: 2008

Lanús
Copa Sudamericana: 2013

Wilstermann
Primera División: 2018 Apertura, 2019 Clausura

International career

International goals
Scores and results list Argentina's goal tally first.

References

External links

Argentine Primera statistics
Chávez, Cristian Manuel at Historia de Boca.com 

1986 births
Living people
Sportspeople from Buenos Aires Province
Argentine footballers
Argentine expatriate footballers
Argentina international footballers
Association football midfielders
Club Atlético Atlas footballers
Boca Juniors footballers
Club Atlético Lanús footballers
Unión Española footballers
Arsenal de Sarandí footballers
Asteras Tripolis F.C. players
C.D. Jorge Wilstermann players
Chilean Primera División players
Argentine Primera División players
Super League Greece players
Expatriate footballers in Chile
Expatriate footballers in Greece
Expatriate footballers in Bolivia